This list of agriculture awards is a index to articles about notable awards given for contributions to agriculture. Awards may be limited to people from the country in which the award is given, or may be open to worldwide contributions.

Awards

See also

 Lists of awards
 Lists of science and technology awards
 List of cannabis competitions

References

 
 
Agriculture